Nishidai Station is the name of three train stations in Japan:

 Nishidai Station (Hyōgo) (西代駅)
 Nishidai Station (Tochigi) (西田井駅)
 Nishidai Station (Tokyo) (西台駅)